Vinkovačke jeseni  (English: Autumns of Vinkovci) is a traditional folklore festival in Vinkovci, Croatia.

The festival was founded in 1966, and is considered one of the major cultural events of the whole of Slavonia, together with Brodsko kolo and Đakovački vezovi.

History

The first Vinkovačke jeseni were organised in September 1966. In the foreground of this festival is the care of folk dances, folk clothing and folk customs, so that traditional values from folk live of Slavonia would be kept alive. In late September 2017 the event was criticized by the individuals from the Serbian Cultural Society "Prosvjeta" for the two decades long exclusion of folk cultures coming from ethnic minorities in Croatia, especially Serb minority that constitute 15,50% of the entire population of Vukovar-Syrmia County. Svetislav Mikerević, President of local Prosvjeta branch in Bobota, stated in an interview that "We are as well citizens of Croatia. We are indeed minority, but culture is not supposed to divide people. It is supposed to connect people, and what we have is culture with borders. It would be natural if we were invited..."

General
Vinkovačke jeseni are held each year in the month of September, which is also the beginning of autumn, after which this festival got its name. The reason for establishment of this festival is that the autumn is the season that awards the most to the People of Slavonia for their hard labor. This festival has soon started to bind all of those who are lovers of cultural heritage, dialects, and old customs.

In the days of the festival the audience finds out everything about the diversity of the folklore in Slavonia, and about the foreign folklores that also participate in Vinkovačke jeseni. The stage is for the duration of the festival provisionally made, and is designed as an open-air Stage. The costumes and the scenography are thematic so in that comes the beauty of shapes and colors of the garments and the sounds of tamburica and gaida to light.

Attractions

 The Opening Ceremony - one of the most visited Events during the Vinkovačke jeseni. The “Opening Ceremony” is actually a mass of people that goes along the streets of Vinkovci and observes the progress of the parade. In this event it is significant to mention the procession of the horsepeople on the horses that move in front of the procession of the people.
 The Review of Original Croatian Folklore - The Review begins after the Opening Ceremony, and lasts for two days. On the review, at first, enter the two most successful folklore associations, first the ones from Vinkovci, and then the other folklore associations from all over Croatia.
 Folklore Evenings - On the folklore evenings are sung songs from around Croatia. The folklore evenings are thought for the restored, and for newly launched folklore societies.
 Small Talks of the Šokci - This is an event, whose task is to represent the former way of life of the People of Slavonia, and to remember how one used to live in Slavonia.

References

External links
 Official website of Vinkovačke jeseni in English

Recurring events established in 1966
Festivals in Croatia
Vinkovci
Folk festivals in Croatia
Autumn events in Croatia
Festivals in Yugoslavia